The Golddiggers was a female singing and dancing troupe created for The Dean Martin Show. They performed on TV, on live tours and internationally with the USO. The group was formed in 1968, dissolved in 1992, and reorganized in 2007, and has numbered between four and 13 members over various time periods.

The act debuted on The Dean Martin Show, and was later featured in a summer replacement television series over three seasons. In addition to backing Martin on his show and in his nightclub act, the group performed on their own on other television programs, in live venues, and in three of Bob Hope's Christmas tours. Several members of the original (1968–73) troupe continue to perform as "The Golddiggers", while other former group members perform in other acts, in groups or as solo artists.

History
The original idea to form a group of singer-dancers that would be called The Golddiggers grew out of a need to find a vehicle that would hold the attention of audiences during the summer months when The Dean Martin Showwhich began airing as a weekly series on NBC Television in September 1965would complete its regular season run and go on hiatus (as was standard practice with virtually all variety series during that era).

It was Dean Martin Show producer-director Greg Garrison who hatched the notion of a series with a nostalgic 1930s motif, and Dean Martin Show Music Director Lee Hale who, inspired by the chorines known as "The Gold Diggers" featured in the Busby Berkeley - Warner Bros. films of the 1930s and '40s, thought of the name The Golddiggers to dub the ensemble of attractive and talented women around which this new show would revolve.

The initial group, which numbered 12 performers, was introduced on The Dean Martin Show in Spring 1968.

On June 20, 1968, they debuted in their own weekly summer variety series, Dean Martin Presents The Golddiggers. The program was the top-rated series of the 1968 summer season, and returned the following July (1969)with a somewhat altered lineup of performersonce again serving as the summer replacement series in Dean Martin's Thursday night time slot.

For the series' third summer outing (which launched in July 1970) it shifted locales to London, with the title modified to become Dean Martin Presents The Golddiggers In London. In addition to airing for an hour each week on NBC in the U.S., this edition of The Golddiggers' series was also seen in half-hour weekly form in England.

In between their summer series, The Golddiggers made occasional appearances on The Dean Martin Show and other programs, and joined Bob Hope in 1968, 1969, and 1970 on his annual USO-sponsored Christmas tours of U.S. military bases around the globe. Highlights of these trips were broadcast annually as specials on NBC, and drew some of the highest ratings of any programs during the years that they were telecast.

In the fall of 1970, The Golddiggers returned to the U.S. and became a regular part of the cast of The Dean Martin Show. That same season, four of the members of The Golddiggers (Michelle DellaFave, Tara Leigh, Susan Lund, and Wanda Bailey) were selected by Greg Garrison and Lee Hale to form a smaller quartet called 'The Dingaling Sisters', which appeared from time to time in their own solo performances on Martin's show.

In fall 1971, The Golddiggers group was spun off from The Dean Martin Show to headline their own weekly half-hour syndicated series entitled Chevrolet Presents The Golddiggers. At the same time, a revamped version of The Dingaling Sisters (comprising Michelle DellaFave, Tara Leigh, Taffy Jones, and Lynne Latham) succeeded The Golddiggers as the regular female singer/dancers on The Dean Martin Show.

Two of the performers joining The Dingaling Sisters during the 1972-73 seasons who would later go on to greater renown were Lindsay Bloom (who appeared in many feature films and co-starred in the 1980s in the weekly CBS series Mickey Spillane's Mike Hammer); and Jayne Kennedy (who would become well-known to American television audiences in the late 1970s and early '80s as a co-host of The NFL Today on CBS).

The Golddiggers' syndicated series, which debuted in 1971, aired for two seasons until the early spring of 1973.

The Golddiggers recorded three albums, the first in early 1969, when Metromedia Records released “The Golddiggers” (MD1009), and within only a few months, released a second album, “The Golddiggers, We Need a Little Christmas” (MD 1012). In 1971, RCA Corporation released their third album, “The Golddiggers… Today” (LSP-4643).

"It got to the point where it got too expensive to have so many girls... they weren't being treated very fairly... It was getting really bad for the girls so they all got together and said, 'We're not going to do this anymore' and they all quit". - Neil Daniels, former NBC VP and founder Dean Martin Fan Center.

"That was the end of the line for us". -Susan Lund, original Golddigger.

In 1973, a new group was chosen: Alberici Sisters - Maria Lauren (aka: Maria Elena Alberici) and Linda Eichberg (aka: Linda Alberici), Patti Gribow (aka: Patti Pivarnik), Deborah Pratt, Susan Buckner, Robin Hoctor, Lee Nolting and Colleen Kincaid.

"To the winners Garrison was all smiles and congratulations."

From 1973 until the 1990s The Golddiggers appeared regularly on Dean Martin's television specials. The biggest country music artists would join Martin and The Golddiggers on the Dean Martin Comedy Hour with a medley of hits: Lynn Anderson, Conway Twitty, Ray Stevens, Buck Owens, Loretta Lynn, Mac Davis, Mel Tillis, as well as entertainers Dionne Warwick, Gene Kelly, Donald O'Connor, and the top comedians for the Roasts segment.

The Golddiggers also took their talent on the road, opening the Las Vegas MGM Grand Hotel and Casino performing in the "Celebrity Room" to sold out crowds with Dean Martin to more than 2,000,000 people.

They were the opening act for Petula Clark, Steve and Eydie, Joan Rivers at Caesars Palace and Bally's Las Vegas, and toured with Bob Hope, Louis Prima, Jerry Vale, and many more entertainers. In 1977, The Golddiggers of the Frank Sinatra and Dean Martin tour were Maria Lauren (aka: Maria Elena Alberici - Riccio) and her sister, Linda (Alberici) - Eichberg, Patti Gribow, Peggy Gohl, Joyce Garro and Robyn Whatley.

1978 brought in a new look to The Golddiggers with new members Linda Snook, Marie Halton, Melody Ruhe, and Julia Hanibal joining remaining members, Robyn Whatley and Peggy Gohl.

The Golddiggers continued with another Mexico tour and also as Dean's opening act in Vegas. The group was booked for television and more Christmas in California specials... "Before long we rejoined The Golddiggers. Working with Dean was a safe haven for us and we continued to perform with him until he retired in 1991."

All of The Golddiggers' musical performances were under the direction of Lee Hale, who later wrote Backstage at the Dean Martin Show. "Although the group started as an even dozen, they ended up as a quartet opening for Dean at his monthly dates in Las Vegas. Those last four girls were definitely among the best". 

Former Dean Martin Golddiggers, including Patti (Pivarnik) Gribow, Joyce Garro, Linda Bott, Marie Halton, Robyn Whatley, Peggy Gohl, Deborah Pratt, Susan Buckner, and the Alberici Sisters: Maria Lauren and Linda Eichberg, have lent their talents to charity events to help the performing arts, women, youth, and AIDS. 

In 1997, Kalliope Zafiriou, former wife of the UFO religion leader Billy Meier, revealed in an interview that Meier had hoaxed his followers by claiming photographs that he had of members of The Golddiggers were photographs of human-like extraterrestrials that he met./ Meier passed off the photographs he had of Golddiggers members Michelle DellaFave and Susan Lund were photographs of the alien women "Asket" and "Nera"./ Further research showed that Zafiriou was correct and that the images were screenshots of a Golddiggers performance on The Dean Martin Show, proving that the photographs were of earthlings and not of aliens.

Members
At various times, members included:

 Sheila (Mann) Allan
 Pauline Antony
 Wanda Bailey
 Pamela Beth
 Nancy Bonetti
 Patti Booth
 Kathy Brimer
 Susan Buckner
 Susan Cadham
 Jimmi Cannon
 Karen Cavanaugh
 Darlene (Alberici) Cianci
 Loyita Chapel
 Jackie Chidsey
 Paula Cinko
 Rosetta Cox
 Lee Crawford
 Cathy Lee Crosby
 Lezlie Dalton
 Michelle DellaFave
 Tanya DellaFave
 Karen Dolin
 Lynn Dolin
 Wendy Douglas
 Linda (Alberici) Eichberg
 Merry Elkins
 Brooke Fisher
 Joyce Garro
 Patti Gegenheimer
 Peggy Gohl
 Patti (Pivaar) Gribow
 Marie Halton
 Julia Hannibal
 Peggy Hansen
 Joy Hawkins
 Robin Horneff
 Sandra Hunt
 Rebecca Jones
 Liz Kelley
 Wendy Kimball
 Colleen (Kincaid) Jackson
 Maria (Alberici) Lauren
 Tara Leigh
 Julie Leven
 Diana Liekhus
 Susan Lund
 Nancy Maier
 Cheryl Masterson
 Debi McFarland
 Micki McGlone
 Francie Mendenhall
 Patricia Mickey
 Theresa (Bishop) Miller
 Lee Nolting
 Marilyn O'Leary
 Darlina Olsen
 Cynthia Pickett
 Brenda Powell
 Deborah Pratt
 Nancy Reichert
 Melody Ruhe
 Barbara Sanders
 Jeanne Sheffield
 Linda Snook Bott
 Holly Smith
 Lynn Steiner
 Debbie Thomason
 Sheryl Ullman
 Robyn Whatley
 Janice Whitby
 Mary Beth Williams
 Mary K. (“Kathy”)Wright
 Glenda Yenta

Albums
 The Golddiggers -  1969
 We Need a Little Christmas - 1969
 The Golddiggers... Today! - 1971

See also
 The Dean Martin Show

References

External links
 
 

American vocal groups
United Service Organizations entertainers